Andrew Faulds (born 12 August 1944) is a Canadian bobsledder. He competed at the 1968 Winter Olympics and the 1972 Winter Olympics.

References

1944 births
Living people
Canadian male bobsledders
Olympic bobsledders of Canada
Bobsledders at the 1968 Winter Olympics
Bobsledders at the 1972 Winter Olympics
Sportspeople from London, Ontario